Marianne Sessi Natorp (died 10 March 1847) was an Italian soprano and composer. Her birth date is listed as 1770, 1771, 1773, or 1776 in various sources. She was best known as a member of the musical Sessi dynasty and a renowned operatic soprano who performed and composed as Marianne Sessi.

Life
Sessi was born in Rome to Franziska Lepri and Giovanni Sessi, who were both singers, as were Sessi's four younger sisters Imperatrice, Anna-Maria, Victoria, and Carolina. Sessi studied voice with her father and debuted at the Italian Opera in Vienna during the 1792–93 season. In 1794 she married Franz Joseph Edler von Natorp, who became a baron in 1801. She stopped performing in 1796, but returned to the stage in 1805 after the couple divorced, singing in operas by Domenico Cimarosa, Simon Mayr, Wolfgang Amadeus Mozart, Giovanni Paisiello, Antonio Salieri, and Niccolò Zingarelli. In 1807, the Academy of Fine Arts in Florence awarded Sessi a gold medal. She toured internationally, singing throughout eastern and western Europe, Russia, and Scandinavia. Sessi stopped performing in 1836 and worked as a singing teacher at the Berlin Royal Opera, ultimately moving to Vienna where she lived with her sister Anna-Maria until her death.

Compositions
Sessi was best known as a singer, but she also composed canzonettas which were published by Breitkopf & Hartel. Her vocal compositions include:

"Amare un Infedele Veder si Abandonare"
"Di Puri Affeti Miei"
"E Dunque Vero"
"Ecce Quel Fiero Instante"
"Nasce Nel Vago Aprile Porporea Rosa"
Nocturne (two voices and piano)
"Non t’Accostar a l’Urna"
"Placido Zeffiretto"
"Sempre piu t’Amo"
"Stanco di Pascolar le Pecorelle"
Ten Canzonettes
Three Canzonettes

References 

Italian women composers
Italian operatic sopranos
1770s births
1847 deaths